Blacktail Deer Creek is a tributary of the Beaverhead River, approximately  long, in southwest Montana, United States.

It rises in the Beaverhead National Forest in the Snowcrest Range in southern Beaverhead County. It flows northwest, joining the Beaverhead River near  Dillon, Montana.

The creek contains rainbow, brook and brown trout as well as mountain whitefish, longnose sucker, longnose dace and mottled sculpin.  On August 7–8, 1863, a group of 28 prospectors embarked from the mouth of Blacktail Deer Creek to prospect for gold in the upper Snake River in Idaho Territory.

The elected captain of the group was Walter W. de Lacy who later produced the first map (1865) of Montana Territory based in part from observations during this expedition.

Variant names
Blacktail Deer Creek has also been known as: Dry Blacktail Creek.

See also

List of rivers of Montana
Montana Stream Access Law

Notes

Rivers of Montana
Rivers of Beaverhead County, Montana
Tributaries of the Beaverhead River